Patrobius  (d. 69) was a prominent freedman in the time of ancient Roman Emperor Nero. He and Helius exercised great and pernicious power and influence under Nero. In 66 AD he put on a luxurious show at Puteoli to honor the Armenian king Tiridates. Patrobius was executed along with several other of Nero's favorites after Galba came to power. They were marched in chains around the city before they were publicly executed.

References 

Imperial Roman slaves and freedmen
Executed ancient Roman people
69 deaths